Reichstadt may refer to

Reichstadt Agreement, an 1876 pact between Austria-Hungary and Russia
The German name for Zákupy, a town in the Czech Republic
Reichstädt, a municipality in Thuringia, Germany

See also
Duke of Reichstadt
Reichsstadt
Reichstag (disambiguation)